McEnaney is a surname of Irish origin. Notable people with the surname include:

Pat McEnaney (born 1962/1963), Irish Gaelic football referee
Séamus McEnaney (born 1967/1968), Irish Gaelic football manager
Will McEnaney (born 1952), American baseball player

See also
Variations on the surname:
McEnany (surname)
McEneaney
McInerney

Anglicised Irish-language surnames